Settler colonialism in Canada is the continuation and the results of the colonization of the assets  of the Indigenous peoples in Canada already present at first. As colonization went further, the Indigenous peoples were subject to policies of forced assimilation and cultural genocide. The policies signed many of which were designed to both allowed stable houses. Governments in Canada in many cases ignored or chose to deny the aboriginal title of the First Nations. The traditional governance of many of the First Nations was replaced with government-imposed structures. Many of the Indigenous cultural practices were banned. First Nation's people status and rights were less than that of settlers. The impact of colonization on Canada can be seen in its culture, history, politics, laws, and legislatures.

The current relationship of Indigenous peoples in Canada and the government is one that has been heavily defined by the effects of settler colonialism and Indigenous resistance. Canadian Courts and recent governments have recognized and eliminated many discriminatory practices.

Government policies

Doctrine of Discovery 
The Christian Doctrine of Discovery is a legal doctrine upon which settler colonialism is justified in Canada. The doctrine allowed Christian European explorers to claim non-Christian lands for their monarch based on papal bulls. The doctrine was applied to the Americas when Pope Alexander VI issued Inter caetera (1493), giving Spain title to "discoveries" in the New World. This was in reaction to Pope Nicholas V's Dum diversas (1452) and Roman Pontifex (1455), which sanctioned Portugal's colonization of North Africa, which led the creation of the transatlantic slave trade.  Subsequent conflict in North America between the French and English governments regarding land claims were settled by the French defeat in the Seven Years' War and the following Royal Proclamation of 1763. Although French Canadians faced discriminatory treatment by English Canadians, eventually the two ethnic groups formulated a Canadian origin myth involving two "founding races", a narrative which ignored the indigenous contribution to Canadian history.

This fundamental misunderstanding regarding underlying title forms the basis of the "land question" in Canada. In the landmark Tsilhqot'in Nation v. British Columbia decision, the Supreme Court of Canada rejected all Crown arguments for Aboriginal title extinguishment, acknowledging the Doctrine of Discovery is racist. While this calls into question the legitimacy of the Canadian settler colonial state to exist on Indigenous territories, what this Supreme Court decision means on the ground remains to be seen.

The Royal Proclamation of 1763 

The Royal Proclamation of Canada is known to be one of the most important treaties in Canada between Europeans and Indigenous peoples. The Royal Proclamation by King George III established the relationship between Indigenous peoples and the Crown, which recognized Indigenous peoples rights as well as defining the treaty making process which is still used in Canada today. The Royal Proclamation also acknowledged the constitutional right that Indigenous peoples have the right to sovereignty and self government. Within the document, both sides agreed that treaties were the most effective legal way for Indigenous peoples to release control of their land, however the Royal Proclamation was drafted by the British government without any Indigenous input which resulted in a monopoly over the purchase of Indigenous lands by the Crown. The Proclamation banned white settlers from claiming the land that was being populated by Indigenous peoples, unless the land had first been purchased by the Crown and then sold to the settlers. As time passed white settlers became eager to establish their own communities and extract resources to send back to Europe, forgoing the guidelines set out in the Proclamation. Colonial settlers did not share the same view as Indigenous peoples on the sacredness of the land, but rather as something that could be easily bought and sold. As the number of colonial settlers increased, the use of land for farming and mining increased, and Indigenous relations that were established in the Royal Proclamation began to deteriorate.

Gradual Civilization Act of 1857 
Assimilation was the goal for the Europeans for Indigenous individuals for much of history, this can be seen in the Gradual Civilization Act. This act was made in 1857 by CAct played on the idea of how Indigenous individuals were 'savages' that needed to be reformed by the 'civilized' Europeans, thus the act being called the Gradual Civilization Act. In some ways the Gradual Civilization Act was an extension of residential schools because it had the same goal but this Act was targeted towards Indigenous men instead of children. Thes Act made it so that Indigenous men, if they wanted to could become a part of the European-Canadian society, they were to give up many different aspects of their culture. The European-Canadian definition of being civilized entailed being able to speak and write in either English or French, and to be as similar to a white man as possible so that there were no discernible differences. There were commissioners that were tasked to make sure that these criteria were filled, and they examined Indigenous individuals to make sure that they were meeting the criteria. The outcome of this was that any individual that was deemed to meet the criteria could become enfranchised. The Act was a direct consequence of settler colonialism as the Indigenous individuals were forced to assimilate to the world views and customs of the settlers.

The Indian Act of 1876 

In 1876 the Indian Act was passed by the Canadian government allowed the administration of Indian Status, reserve lands and local Indigenous governance. The Act gave the Canadian Government control over Indigenous identity, political practices, governance, cultural practices and education. One of the underlying motivations in the Act was to enforce a policy of assimilation and Cultural genocide, to prohibit Indigenous peoples from practicing their own cultural, political and spiritual beliefs. The Act defined Indian Status and the entitlement and legal conditions that accompanied it, established land management regimes on reserves, managed the sales of natural resources, and defined band council powers and electoral systems.

Gender discrimination within the Act enforced gender bias as another means of extinguishing Indian Status, thereby excluding women from their rights. Under this legislation, an Indian woman who married a non-Indian man would no longer be Indian. She would lose her Status, treaty benefits, health benefits, the right to live on reserve, the right to inherit property, and even the right to be buried with ancestors. However, when an Indian man married a woman without Status, he retained all his rights.

In 1951, after World War II, the Act was amended, to lift the various restrictions on Indigenous culture, religion and politics. This included the removing bans on Potlatch and Sun Dance ceremonies. Additionally, these amendments allowed women to vote in band council elections and Elsie Marie Knott was the first woman to be elected Chief in Canada. However, these actions didn't eliminate gender disparity in Status requirements. Instead of having "Indian blood", Status was assigned through the Indian Register, where male lines of descent were still privileged. In 1985, the Act was amended again, through Bill C-31, in order to reflect the newly enacted the Canadian Charter of Rights and Freedoms. The amendment allows women who "married out" of their band,to apply for their rights and Indian status to be restored.

Residential schools 

The Canadian Indian residential school system was an extensive school system that was set up by the Government of Canada and organized and ran by Churches. Residential schools began operation in Canada in the 1880s and began to close during the end of the 20th century.   Residential school's main objectives were to educate Indigenous children, by teaching Euro-Canadian and Christian values and ways of living to assimilate Indigenous children into standard Canadian cultures. The values that were taught in residential schools were brought to Canada from the colonial settlers who made up a majority of the Canadian population at this time.
   

In Canada over 150,000 children attended residential schools throughout the century that they were in operation. The Indigenous children that attended residential schools were forcibly removed from their homes and families. While at residential schools, students were no longer allowed to speak their own language or acknowledge their culture or heritage without the threat of punishment.  If rules were broken the students were brutally punished. Residential schools were known for students experiencing physical, sexual, emotional and psychological abuse from the staff of the schools. Residential schools resulted in generations of Indigenous peoples who lost their language and culture. The removal of homes at such a young age also resulted in generations of peoples who did not have the knowledge or skills to have families of their own.

As settlers began to populate Canada, they brought their own Eurocentric views that believed that their civilization was the ultimate goal. Settlers saw Indigenous people as savage pagans that needed to be civilized, with the best means of doing so was through government mandated education.  Residential schools did not as much result in the education of Indigenous peoples, as much as it did result in a 'cultural genocide' of Indigenous peoples.  The establishment of residential schools is a direct link to colonial settlers and the values that they brought, when they began to populate what we know today as Canada.

Ongoing effects of colonialism in Canada

Colonialism in current times 
Colonialism is defined by its practice of domination which includes the subjugation of one people, the colonizers over another, the colonized. The distinction of settler colonialism is its goal of replacing the people already living there. Through colonization Canada's Indigenous people have been subject to the destruction against their culture and traditions through assimilation and force. It can be argued that Colonialism and its effects are still ongoing when looking at current events.

Forced sterilization of Indigenous people 
Forced sterilization is defined as the removal of a person's reproductive organs either through force or coercion, and is viewed as a human rights violation. Its effect against Indigenous women has also identified it as violence against women and a form of racial discrimination. Canada has had a history of sterilization which has disproportionately affected Indigenous women in the North. This has led to proposals on how healthcare can be better tailored to address the discrimination Indigenous women face when receiving healthcare.

Indigenous women have reported to having found out that their fallopian tubes had been tied without their consent or were coerced into agreeing to it by doctors who assured them it was reversible. The interference in Indigenous peoples reproductive lives were justified using the ideology of Eugenics. Although the Sexual Sterilization Act in Canada was repealed in 1972, the sterilizations of Indigenous people have continued. While the policies of coercive sterilization on Indigenous women have been recognized as sexist, racist and imperialist the extent to which it has systematically impacted Indigenous women is not an isolated instance of abuse. It can be looked at as a part of a larger context involving the colonization and racism Indigenous people face.

Missing and murdered Indigenous women and girls 

Missing and murdered Indigenous women and girls (MMIWG) is an ongoing issue that gained awareness through the efforts of the 2015 Truth and Reconciliation Commission of Canada (TRC) when it called for a national inquiry on missing and murdered Indigenous women and girls in Canada. A 2014 report by the Royal Canadian Mounted Police, suggests that between 1980 and 2012 1,017 Indigenous women were victims of homicide with 164 Indigenous women still considered missing.  Statistics show that Indigenous women of at least 15 years of age are three times more likely than non-Indigenous women to be victims of a violent crime. The homicide rates of Indigenous women between 1997 and 2000 were seven times higher than non-Indigenous women.

Indigenous women were first sexualized and racialized by the European settlers during their colonization of Canada, and these stereotypes have continued to affect Indigenous women today. Canadian author Janice Accose's book Iskwewak--kah' ki yaw ni wahkomakanak draws the connection of how racist and sexist depictions of Indigenous women in popular literature have contributed to violence against Indigenous women which has led to the issue of MMIWG. Notable to MMIWG is the Highway of Tears, a 725-kilometre stretch of highway 16 in British Columbia, that has been the location of many murders and disappearances beginning in 1970, disproportionately of which have been Indigenous women.

Mass incarceration 

Mass incarceration is an ongoing issue between Indigenous peoples and Canada's legal system in which Indigenous people are overrepresented within the Canadian prison population. Mass incarceration of Indigenous peoples results from a variety of problems stemming from settler colonialism that Indigenous peoples face daily including, poverty, substance abuse, lack of education and lack of employment opportunities. In 1999, the Supreme Court of Canada decided in R v Gladue that courts must consider the "circumstances of Aboriginal offenders." This decision lead to the creation of Gladue reports which allow Indigenous people to go through pre-sentencing and bail hearings that consider the way colonialism has harmed the Indigenous offender including considering cultural oppression, abuse suffered in residential schools and poverty. Thirteen years after the Gladue decision, the Supreme Court of Canada reaffirmed the decision in R v Ipeelee extending the decision to require courts to consider the impact of colonialism on every Indigenous person being sentenced. These decisions were made to address the overrepresentation of Indigenous peoples in the prison population, however, the population has only been steadily increasing. Indigenous peoples in Canada only make up about 5% of the total population yet, in 2020 Indigenous people surpassed 30% of people behind bars. Further, in 2020 Indigenous women accounted for 42% of the female inmate population in Canada. Compared to non-Indigenous people, Indigenous peoples are less likely to be released on parole, are disproportionately placed in maximum security facilities, are more likely to be involved in use of force or self-injury incidents, and are more often placed in segregation.

Indigenous resistance

Indigenous mobilization against the 1969 White Paper 
In 1969, Prime Minister Pierre Trudeau and Minister of Indian Affairs Jean Chrétien proposed the White Paper, which recommended abolishing the Indian Act to extend full citizenship to Indigenous peoples after the Hawthorn report concluded Indigenous peoples were "citizens minus." If entered into force, Indigenous peoples would become an ethnic group 'equal' to others in Canada, therefore rendering Aboriginal title and rights 'unequal.' This policy espoused a liberal definition of equality in which legislated differences between Indigenous peoples and Canadians created inequities, rather than attributing inequities to the ongoing violence of settler colonialism. The White Paper indicated how colonial understandings of treaties as contracts differed from Indigenous understandings of covenants, as it would eliminate federal fiduciary responsibilities established by treaties and the Indian Act. Indigenous mobilization against the White Paper culminated in Harold Cardinal's Red Paper (also known as "Citizens Plus"). While the White Paper was not enacted, it was preceded and succeeded by further assimilation strategies.

Tk'emlupsemc, French-Canadian, and Ukrainian historian Sarah Nickel argued scholars marking the White Paper as a turning point in pan-Indigenous political mobilization obfuscates both local responses and longer histories of Indigenous struggles by unfairly centering one settler policy. Further, Indigenous women's organizations were marginalized despite claims of pan-Indigenous mobilization against the White Paper. This diminished the continuous presence of Indigenous women undertaking political struggles, especially on intersectional issues of Indigeneity and gender, such as marrying-out policies.

Walking with Our Sisters 
Another ongoing movement in direct relation to MMIWG is Walking with Our Sisters. It is a commemorative art installation using vamps, the tops of Moccasins, as a way to represent the unfinished lives of the Indigenous women who are murdered or missing.

An art installation entitled Every One by Cannupa Hanska Luger, an enrolled member of the Three Affiliated Tribes of the Fort Berthold Reservation who is of Mandan, Hidatsa, Arikara, Lakota, Austrian, and Norwegian heritage shows the strength of Indigenous communities. This art installation, which was on display at the Gardiner Museum in Toronto, is a massive piece made from ceramic beads. These beads that make up the face of an Indigenous women are each meant to represent a Missing or Murdered Indigenous person. The making of these beads in part were by Indigenous individuals who wanted to raise awareness for this alarming situation. The crux of the installation is that it is meant to humanize those who are missing and murdered because reducing people to statistics can create a sense of detachment. There has also been a dehumanization of Indigenous peoples from the settler mindset as they were thought to be 'savages' because of their different way of life. This piece is in defiance of the dehumanization of Indigenous individuals and to put the MMIWG situation at the front of the observer's eye. Observers can not just look away they must face the reality of the situation.

Wet'suwet'en resistance to pipeline projects 

The Wet'suwet'en First Nation, located in the northeast of colonial British Columbia's central interior region, has long been engaged in an ongoing struggle against the Canadian state to protect its rights and land. A crucial victory came in 1997, with the legal case Delgamuukw v British Columbia, which expanded on the earlier Calder v British Columbia (AG) and helped codify the ideas that Aboriginal title existed prior to, and could exist outside of Canadian sovereignty and that infringements against Aboriginal title by the Canadian state were possible. While several Indigenous groups negotiated terms of treaty with the Canadian state, the Wet’suwet’en reaffirmed their right to sovereignty, and in 2008 removed themselves from the treaty process with British Columbia altogether.

See also 
 Acculturation
 Cultural assimilation of Native Americans
 European colonization of the Americas
 Indigenous peoples in Canada
 Language shift
 Indigenous Peoples and the Canadian Criminal Justice System

References

Further reading

External links 
 Aboriginal Peoples and Communities – Indigenous and Northern Affairs Canada
 Aboriginal Heritage Resources and Services – Library and Archives Canada
  Battle for Aboriginal Treaty Rights – Canadian Broadcasting Corporation (Digital Archives)
 History of Aboriginal Treaties and Relations in Canada – Department of Canadian Heritage

History of Indigenous peoples in Canada
Settler colonialism